The Moosup River is a river in the U.S. states of Rhode Island and Connecticut. The river is named after the Native American sachem Maussup.

Course
The river rises from Clark Pond in Foster, Rhode Island. From there, it flows south through Foster and Coventry, then turns west and heads into Connecticut, flowing through Sterling and Plainfield to its mouth at the Quinebaug River.

Dam Removal

The American Rivers organization has targeted the Moosup River for dam removal to help fish to swim upstream to spawn.
In late June 2014 Moosup Dam #1 in Connecticut was removed  and on September 29, 2015, the Griswold Rubber dam in Connecticut was removed.

Crossings
Below is a list all crossings over the Moosup River. The list starts at the headwaters and goes downstream.

Tributaries
In addition to many unnamed tributaries, the following brooks feed the Moosup:
West Meadow Brook
Bucks Horn Brook
Roaring Brook
Vaughn Brook
Quanduck Brook
Angell Brook

See also
List of rivers in Rhode Island
List of rivers in Connecticut
Moosup River Site (RI-1153)

References

Maps from the United States Geological Survey

Rivers of Providence County, Rhode Island
Rivers of Kent County, Rhode Island
Rivers of Windham County, Connecticut
Plainfield, Connecticut
Rivers of Connecticut
Rivers of Rhode Island
Tributaries of the Thames River (Connecticut)